32 Regiment Royal Artillery ("The Wessex Gunners") is a regiment in the Royal Artillery, part of the British Army and is equipped with the Lockheed Martin Desert Hawk III and PUMA 2 miniature unmanned aerial vehicles. 32nd Regiment is the only Royal Artillery unit that operates MUAS and along with the 5th Regiment Royal Artillery provides an integrated tactical and strategic; intelligence, surveillance, target acquisition, and reconnaissance (ISTAR) capability. 

As part of 6th Division, under the immediate command of 1st Intelligence & Surveillance Brigade (1ISR), 32nd Regiment supports the Reactive Force elements of the British Army and provides dedicated MUAS capability to the 3rd (UK) Division.

History
The regiment has its origins in 7th Medium Brigade which was raised in 1927, evolved into 7th Medium Regiment and served throughout the Second World War.

In 1947, the 32nd Regimental Headquarters (RHQ) was retitled as the 45th Field Regiment and the 7th Medium Regiment RHQ was retitled as the 32nd. 

In 1966, the regiment became a Heavy Regiment with M107 175 mm self-propelled  
guns. In 1972, it became a light Regiment, equipped with 105mm Light Guns; then, in 1978, a Guided Missile Regiment equipped with Swingfire anti-tank missile. In 1985, it became a heavy regiment again with M107 guns based in Dortmund. During the Gulf War, the regiment was equipped with M110 self-propelled 203 mm howitzers and served as part of the Divisional Artillery Group supporting the 1st Armoured Division.

In December 2016 it was announced that the Regiment would be disbanded and its personnel redistributed to other parts of the British Army. In the British Army's Soldier Magazine October 2020 edition, it was confirmed the regiment would not disband but will continue to support the field army in the Mini-Unmanned Aerial Systems (MUAS) support role, using the Puma and Wasp AE (All Environment) mini unmanned air system.

As part of the Future Soldier Programme, the regiment will gain an addition MUAS battery by 2023 in the form of 42 (Alem Hamza) Battery.

Batteries
The Regiment currently comprises the following batteries:

46 (Talavera) Headquarters Battery
18 (Quebec 1759) Battery
21 (Gibraltar 1779–83) Air Assault Battery (Supporting 16 Air Assault Brigade)
22 (Gibraltar 1779–83) Battery

References

External links
32 Regiment Royal Artillery
32 Regiment RA in action in the 1991 Gulf War

Royal Artillery regiments
Military units and formations of the United Kingdom in the War in Afghanistan (2001–2021)